Reinhold Carl Thusmann Felderhoff (25 February 1865 – 18 December 1919) was a German sculptor.

Life 

Felderhoff was born in Elbing, West Prussia (Elbląg, Poland). He entered the Prussian Academy of Arts in 1880 and studied there under Fritz Schaper until 1884, after which he became a Master Student in the studio of Reinhold Begas. In 1885, he spent a year in Rome on a scholarship, then returned for more work with Begas, remaining there through 1888, although he was doing free-lance work as early as 1887 and won a government contract to sculpt busts of famous generals for the Berlin Armory (Zeughaus, now the German Historical Museum).

1890 and 1891 brought another stay in Rome. He then helped his mentor, Begas, to complete the National Kaiser Wilhelm Monument, for which he received a medal in 1897.

Felderhoff joined the Berlin Secession and became a member of the Academy in 1913. He was named a Professor there in 1917 and died in Berlin in 1919.

Work 
His model of Albert the Bear drew praise in 1893, when it was entered in a competition to provide figures for the Fisherman's Bridge. Although the contract went to Johannes Boese, it enabled Felderhoff to negotiate a commission for a statue and busts in the Siegesallee project and was used as the basis for the central figure; Johann II, Margrave of Brandenburg (Group 6). He was the only Siegesallee sculptor to work in an austere modern style, rather than the favored historical style. (Some changes were made when Kaiser Wilhelm reviewed the sketches, but their nature is unknown). This caused his work to be criticized as "mediocre".

One of his best-known works is the statue of Diana, which was displayed at the Exposition Universelle (1900). It has been reproduced and recast many times.

Other selected major projects 
Berlin

 1895: Die Eitelkeit (Vanity); statue for the wardrobe of the Reichstag building.
 1898/1899: Seated figure of Wilhelm Conrad Röntgen; on the Potsdam Bridge (dismantled and melted in 1945)
 1904: Two large stone benches with hunting motifs; (Tiergarten, destroyed).
 1916: Stralauer Fischer; originally part of a fountain, now at the corner of Neue Krugallee 4 and Bulgarische Straße.
Other cities
 1894–1899: The Bismarck Monument; Essen.
 1901: Seated figure of Johannes Brahms; in the vestibule of the Brahms Institute at the Lübeck Academy of Music.
 1903: Amphitrite Fountain; Stettin (Szczecin)(destroyed)

References

Further reading 
 Peter Bloch, Sibylle Einholz, Jutta von Simson: Ethos und Pathos. Die Berliner Bildhauerschule 1786–1914. Katalog. Berlin 1990.
 Kurt Hoffmann: Ein Brahms-Denkmal für Hamburg? Zur Geschichte des Modells von Reinhold Felderhoff. In: Martin Meyer: Brahms-Studien. Vol. 13. Brahms-Gesellschaft, Tutzing 2002.

External links 

1865 births
1919 deaths
People from Elbląg
People from West Prussia
Prussian Academy of Arts alumni
Academic staff of the Prussian Academy of Arts
20th-century German sculptors
20th-century German male artists
19th-century German sculptors
German male sculptors